Diaphora is a genus of tiger moths in the family Erebidae described by Stephens in 1827. The moths are found in the Palearctic region.

Species
Diaphora × beata (Caradja, 1898)
Diaphora × hilaris (Caradja, 1898)
Diaphora × inversa (Caradja, 1898)
Diaphora luctuosa (Geyer, [1831])
Diaphora mendica (Clerck, 1759) – muslin moth
Diaphora × seileri (Caradja, 1898)
Diaphora sordida (Hübner, [1803])

References

Spilosomina
Moth genera
Palearctic Lepidoptera
Taxa named by James Francis Stephens